Christian Eisenberger (born 1978 in Semriach near Graz) is an Austrian artist.

Life 

After attending the Ortwein school in Graz in 1999, Christian Eisenberger studied Transmediale Kunst in the class of Brigitte Kowanz at the Academy of Fine Arts Vienna from 2000 to 2004. In 2013 he participated in the artist in residence programme of one world foundation (in cooperation with Galerie Krinzinger) in Sri Lanka. Christian Eisenberger lives and works in Vienna and Semriach.

Work 

Christian Eisenberger initially became known for thousands of painted cardboard cutouts which he, at first anonymously, placed in public space. His motifs were social outcasts, such as immigrants or beggars. Later on, he portrayed famous figures of world history, often adorned with halos. These portraits were typically marked with a number, the last of them carrying the number 9975.1. The ephemeral nature of this early series can still be found in many of his works today. Christian Eisenberger's work as a whole defies exact categorization. However, it is often associated with Land art, Conceptual art, Arte Povera, Appropriation, Video art and others. Eisenberger's art also contains numerous references to classical genres, such as expressionist painting and sculpture. The themes around which his work revolves are equally diverse, as he treats classical subjects of art history (life, death, vanitas motives) as well as political topics, such as criticism of institutions. His art creates a universe that is complex without being melodramatic. The artist typically works in series, often elaborating individual ideas and concepts throughout several years, which causes his work to grow radially rather than linearly.

Exhibitions (selection)

Solo exhibitions 

 2011: Employees Must Wash Hands Before Returning To Work, Pablo's Birthday Gallery, New York City 
 2011: HYPERKOLLABORATIVE HYPOTHESENRELEKTOR 9975/22928/12100, ES contemporary art gallery, Merano 
 2010: IMG3171PSD, Konzett Gallery, Vienna
 2010: Metastasen – tief, Projektraum Viktor Bucher, Vienna

Group exhibitions 

 2014: André Butzer / Christian Eisenberger, Künstlerhaus KM–, Halle für Kunst & Medien, Graz
 2012: Colombo Art Biennale – Becoming, Colombo Art Biennale, Colombo
 2012: Der Nackte Mann, Lentos Kunstmuseum Linz, Linz
 2012: Escape the golden cage, International Exhibition of Urban Art, Vienna
 2012: Malerei: Prozess und Expansion, MUMOK, Vienna 
 2012: Street and Studio, Kunsthalle Wien, Vienna
 2012: Triennale Linz 1.0, Gegenwartskunst in Österreich, Lentos Kunstmuseum Linz, Linz
 2012: The Armory Show, New York City

Literature 

 Markus Gugatschka (ed.): Reserve – Help me kill me. Kerber Verlag, Bielefeld, 2012.

References

External links 
 Official Website
 Article about art installation "Helden" by Christian Eisenberger at dispari&dispari project
 Review of sculptures by Christian Eisenberger at Portale di Venezia
 Christian Eisenberger at artfacts.net
 Christian Eisenberger at artnet.com
 Christian Eisenberger at Pablo's Birthday Gallery, New York
 Christian Eisenberger at Triennale Linz
 Christian Eisenberger at VOLTA
 Konzett Gallery
 Altnöder Gallery
 Gölles Gallery
 TEAPOT Gallery

Living people
Austrian artists
Year of birth missing (living people)